The FIA European Formula 3 Cup was a Formula Three race held annually in Europe from 1985 to 1990 and 1999 to 2004. The Cup was awarded by the Fédération Internationale de l'Automobile, the world governing body for motorsport, as its main Formula Three title in Europe after the European Formula 3 Championship was cancelled in 1984. A different venue in Europe hosted the Cup each year during its initial run, while the revival in 1999 saw the Cup between the headline event of the Pau Grand Prix. In 2003 the Formula 3 Euro Series was started, and the event was ended the following year.

European Formula 3 Cup winners

Performance by country

See also
FIA European Formula Three Championship
Formula 3 Euro Series

External links
FIA European Formula 3 Cup at forix.com

 
European Formula . Cup
Formula 3 Cup
1985 establishments in Europe
2004 disestablishments in Europe